Margarita Fisher (née Fischer, February 12, 1886 – March 11, 1975) was an American actress in silent motion pictures and stage productions. Newspapers sometimes referred to her as "Babe" Fischer.

Early life
Margarita Fischer was born on February 12, 1886, in Missouri Valley, Iowa, although a 1902 newspaper article referred to her as "a native of Silverton, Marion County", in Oregon. Her parents were Johan (later John), a first generation German-American, hotelkeeper, and later noted minstrel, and Katherine "Kate" E. Fischer (née Hageny). She had an older sister, Dorothy, who was two years older and acted in productions with her in their childhood.

Theater
As a child performer, and later as an ingenue star of the stage, Fischer was widely regarded in stock company groups of the Pacific Coast. When she was eight years old, a theatrical manager began using her in "heavy dramatic roles". Billed as "The Wonder Child", she continued in that pattern for several years. Fischer made her stage debut in Portland, Oregon, in the child role of Adrienne in The Celebrated Case. In 1901, she became the leading lady for the Fischer-Van Cleve Company. Her rapidly growing popularity led to her father forming the Margarita Fischer Stock Company. The theatrical group toured up and down the Pacific Coast for a number of years. After her father's death, Fischer acted in several stock companies, including one headed by Grace George.

After Fischer began performing in vaudeville, she met her eventual husband, film director Harry A. Pollard. They formed a team that performed the sketch "When Hearts Are Trumps" in "the principal vaudeville circuits". Some years later the two met again, as actors with the Selig Polyscape Company, with the Imp Company in New York, New York, and even later, with Universal Pictures.

Motion pictures
When Fischer left vaudeville, she began working in films for the Selig Polyscope Company in Chicago. She was in Hollywood silent films from at least 1910 until 1927. Her first screen experience began with the American Company. There followed 3 years as a leading woman for Universal. In 1913 she starred in How Men Propose written and directed by Lois Weber for Universal, which at the time was still based on the east coast. When the American Beauty Company was organized she was engaged for each of the star feminine roles. 

She is well known for her role as an African-American slave girl in the Harriet Beecher Stowe three-reel epic Uncle Tom's Cabin. She was co-featured with Harry Pollard in this Universal feature. It was in this role, as Eliza, that Fischer won a long-term contract with the American Film Company in Santa Barbara, California. She received international acclaim as the American Beauty of the screen. Her face was pictured in the heart of a rose, which became one of the movie's trade marks. Pollard directed the Universal superproduction of Uncle Tom's Cabin which was released in 1927. This time Margarita was cast in the more mature role of Eliza.

Aside from this film, the actress' motion pictures of note include Lost: A Union Suit (1914), A Joke On Jane (1914), The Quest (1915), Robinson Crusoe (1917), Impossible Susan (1918), Trixie From Broadway (1919), The Thirtieth Piece of Silver (1920), and Any Woman (1925). In April 1916 Fischer and her husband launched the Pollard Picture Plays Corporation. Pollard directed, Margarita acted, and director/producer George W. Lederer was their protégé. Their initial production was The Pearl of Paradise. It was staged in Los Angeles, California, Honolulu, Hawaii, and the South Sea Islands.

Later years and death
During World War I Fischer changed the spelling of her last name to Fisher because of the anti-German sentiment in America. She is sometimes credited as Margarieta Fisher, Marguerite Fisher, Margarite Fisher, and Margurita Fisher.

In 1944, she was living in San Diego and was a registered Republican. 

Fischer died in Encinitas, California of heart disease in 1975. She was interred at Forest Lawn Memorial Park.

Gallery

Filmography

 There, Little Girl, Don't Cry (1910)*short
 Trimming of Paradise Gulch (1910)*short
 After Many Years (1910)*short
 Romeo and Juliet in Our Town (1910)*short
 The Way of the Red Man (1910)*short
 The Cowboy's Strategem (1910)*short
 His First Long Dress (1910)*short
 The Road to Richmond (1910)*short
 Big Medicine (1910)*short
 The Kentucky Pioneer (1910)*short
 For Her Country's Sake (1910)*short
 Settled Out of Court (1910)*short
 The Early Settlers (1910)*short
 The Vampire (1910)*short
 The Merry Wives of Windsor (1910)*short
 Two Lucky Jims (1910)*short
 In the Wilderness (1910)*short
 The Squaw and the Man (1910)*short
 The Tenderfoot's Round-Up (1911)*short
 An Arizona Romance (1911)*short
 Buddy, the Little Guardian (1911)*short
 Bertie's Bandit (1911)*short
 The Mission in the Desert (1911)*short
 The Sheriff's Sweetheart (1911)*short
 Over the Hills (1911)*short
 The Girl and the Half-Back (1911)*short
 A Pair of Gloves (1911)*short
 The Portrait (1911)*short
 A Lesson to Husbands (1911)*short
 The Trinity (1912)*short
 The Worth of a Man (1912)*short
 Mrs. Matthews, Dressmaker (1912)*short
 Who Wears Them? (1912)*short
 The Rose of California (1912)*short
 The Call of the Drum (1912)*short
 Better Than Gold (1912)*short
 The Baby (1912)*short
 Squnk City Fire Company (1912)*short
 Where Paths Meet (1912)*short
 The Dove and the Serpent (1912)*short
 A Melodrama of Yesterday (1912)*short
 On the Shore (1912)*short
 The Land of Promise (1912)*short
 Jim's Atonement (1912)*short
 The Return of Captain John (1912)*short
 Nothing Shall Be Hidden (1912)*short
 Love, War and a Bonnet (1912)*short
 The Parson and the Medicine Man (1912)*short
 Hearts in Conflict (1912)*short
 The Hand of Mystery (1912)*short
 Big Hearted Sim (1912)*short
 Her Burglar (1912)*short
 On the Border Line (1912)*short
 The Exchange of Labels (1912)*short
 The Employer's Liability (1912)*short
 Betty's Bandit (1912)*short
 The Tribal Law (1912)*short
 A Fight for Friendship (1912)*short
 Trapped by Fire (1912)*short
 The Regeneration of Worthless Dan (1912)*short
 An Indian Outcast (1912)*short
 Romance and Reality (1912)*short
 The Rights of a Savage (1912)*short
 The Mountain Girl's Self-Sacrifice (1912)*short
 The Old Folks' Christmas (1912)*short
 The Great Ganton Mystery (1913)
 Until Death (1913)*short
 A Friend of the Family (1913)*short
 The Wayward Sister (1913)*short
 The Turn of the Tide (1913)*short
 In Slavery Days (1913)*short
 The Boob (1913)*short
 The World at Large (1913)*short
 The Shadow (1913)*short
 The Stolen Idol (1913)*short
 Draga, the Gypsy (1913)*short
 A Woman's Folly (1913)*short
 A Wrong Road (1913)*short
 Robinson Cruesoe (1913)*short
 The Power of Heredity (1913)*short
 When the Prince Arrived (1913)*short
 Sally Scraggs, Housemaid (1913)*short
 Uncle Tom's Cabin (1913)*short
 A Woman's Stratagem (1913)*short
 The Evil Power (1913)*short
 The Light Woman (1913)*short
 The Diamond Makers (1913)*short
 The Fight Against Evil (1913)*short
 Paying the Price (1913)*short
 Shon the Piper (1913)*short

 Like Darby and Joan (1913)*short
 The Thumb Print (1913)*short
 The Primeval Test (1913)*short
 The Missionary Box (1913)*short
 His Old-Fashioned Dad (1913)*short
 A Tale of the Lonely Coast (1913)*short
 The Boob's Dream Girl (1913)*short
 Withering Roses (1914)*short
 Fooling Uncle (1914)*short
 Bess, the Outcast (1914)*short
 Sally's Elopement (1914)*short
 The Wife (1914)*short
 The Sacrifice (1914)*short
 The Professor's Awakening (1914)*short
 Italian Love (1914)*short
 Closed at Ten (1914)*short
 The Girl Who Dared (1914)*short
 The Peacock Feather Fan (1914)*short
 Sweet Land of Liberty (1914)*short
 Retribution (1914)*short
 Mlle. La Mode (1914)*short
 The Man Who Came Back (1914)*short
 A Flurry in Hats (1914)*short
 Eugenics Versus Love (1914)*short
 Her Heritage (1914)*short
 The Courting of Prudence (1914)*short
 Jane, the Justice (1914)*short
 Drifting Hearts (1914)*short
 Nancy's Husband (1914)*short
 The Dream Ship (1914)*short
 The Tale of a Tailor (1914)*short
 Via the Fire Escape (1914)*short
 The Other Train (1914)*short
 A Joke on Jane (1914)*short
 Her 'Really' Mother (1914)*short
 A Midsummer's Love Tangle (1914)*short
 A Suspended Ceremony (1914)*short
 Suzanna's New Suit (1914)*short
 The Silence of John Gordon (1914)*short
 Susie's New Shoes (1914)*short
 A Modern Othello (1914)*short
 The Motherless Kids (1914)*short
 The Only Way (1914)*short
 Caught in a Tight Pinch (1914)*short
 The Legend of Black Rock (1914)*short
 Nieda (1914)*short
 Motherhood (1914)*short
 When Queenie Came Back (1914)*short
 Cupid and a Dress Coat (1914)*short
 The Quest (1914)
 The Lonesome Heart (1915)
 The Girl from His Town" (1915)
 Infatuation (1915)
 The Miracle of Life (1915)
 The Dragon (1916)
 The Pearl of Paradise (1916)
 Miss Jackie of the Navy (1916)
 The Butterfly Girl (1917)
 The Diamond Thieves (1917)*short
 Robinson Cruesoe (1917)*short
 The Sin Unatoned (1917)*short
 The Human Flame (1917)*short
 The Devil's Assistant (1917)
 The Girl Who Couldn't Grow Up (1917)
 Miss Jackie of the Army (1917)
 Molly Go Get 'Em (1918)
 Jilted Janet (1918)
 Ann's Finish (1918)
 The Primitive Woman (1918)
 The Square Deal (1918)
 Impossible Susan (1918)
 Money Isn't Everything (1918)
 Fair Enough (1918)
 The Mantle of Charity (1918)
 Molly of the Follies (1919)
 Put Up Your Hands! (1919)
 Charge It to Me (1919)
 Trixie from Broadway (1919)
 The Tiger Lily (1919)
 The Hellion (1919)
 The Dangerous Talent (1920)
 The Thirtieth Piece of Silver (1920)
 The Week-End (1920)
 Their Mutual Child (1921)
 The Gamesters (1920)
 Payment Guaranteed (1921)
 Beach of Dreams (1921)
 K – The Unknown (1924)
 Any Woman (1925)
 Uncle Tom's Cabin (1927)

References

 Sandusky, Ohio Star-Journal, Saturday, April 8, 1916, Page 10.
 Syracuse, New York Herald'', "Topsy Grows To Eliza In Movie", Sunday Morning, September 28, 1930.

External links

 
 
Fischer and Harry Pollard portrait

1886 births
1975 deaths
American film actresses
American silent film actresses
19th-century American actresses
American stage actresses
People from Harrison County, Iowa
20th-century American actresses
Burials at Forest Lawn Memorial Park (Glendale)
Actresses from Iowa
Vaudeville performers